Lake Tinquicocha (possibly from Quechua t'inki union, qucha lake) is a lake in Peru located in the Huanuco Region, Lauricocha Province, Cauri District at a height of about 4,365 m. It is located in the Raura mountain range, southeast of Lake Patarcocha, west of Lake Carhuacocha and north of the smaller Lake Puyhuancocha. Lake Tinquicocha is 2 km long and 0.47 km at its widest point.

See also
List of lakes in Peru

References

Lakes of Peru
Lakes of Huánuco Region